Cantyn Chastang (born 30 March 1998) is a French professional footballer who plays as a midfielder for Chmpionnat National 2 club Moulins Yzeure.

References

1998 births
Living people
Association football midfielders
French footballers
Clermont Foot players
Bergerac Périgord FC players
Moulins Yzeure Foot players
Championnat National 3 players
Ligue 2 players
Championnat National 2 players